The Northern Mariana Islands national under-17 football team is the under-17 football (soccer) team of the Northern Mariana Islands and is controlled by the Northern Mariana Islands Football Association. The team is not a member of FIFA and is therefore ineligible to qualify or participate in the FIFA U-17 World Cup.

Competition Records

FIFA U-17 World Cup record

1985 to 2021 - Non-FIFA member; ineligible

AFC U-16 Championship record

1985 to 2012 - Did Not Enter
2014 to 2018 - Did Not Qualify

U17
Asian national under-17 association football teams